Placopsis imshaugii is a species of lichen in the family Trapeliaceae. Known from Chile, it was described as new to science in 2011.

References

Baeomycetales
Lichen species
Lichens described in 2011
Lichens of Chile
Taxa named by David Galloway (botanist)